Carayonemidae is a family of scale insects commonly known as carayonemids. They typically live among mosses and leaf litter which is unusual for scale insects. Members of this family come from Neotropical areas of South and Central America.

Life cycle
Very little is known about this family, but in one species, the female scale has four instars.

Genera
There are four genera, each with a single known species:
 Baloghicoccus costaricaensis
 Carayonema orousseti
 Foldicoccus monikae
 Mahunkacoccus mexicoensis

Foldicoccus monikae is flattened and leaf-shaped and the adult has six legs and a pair of antennae.

References
  

Scale insects
Hemiptera families
Neococcoids